Chloe is a 2022  British six-part psychological thriller series created by Alice Seabright for BBC One and Amazon Studios that premiered in the United Kingdom on BBC One on 6 February 2022, and released worldwide on 24 June on Amazon Prime Video. It received critical acclaim, with praise going towards Erin Doherty's performance.

Premise
A mystery about obsession, deceit, identity, and grief from creator and writer Alice Seabright (director, Sex Education). Through her alter-ego, a woman becomes a powerful, transgressive heroine; a popular, well-connected ‘someone’ with a life and lovers that are far more exciting and addictive than the ‘no-one’ she was known as. However, the pretense soon obscures and conflates reality, and the woman risks losing herself completely in the game she is playing.

Plot
A lonely twentysomething, Becky Green, becomes obsessed with the suicide of her estranged childhood friend Chloe and assumes a new identity as Sasha to engineer a "chance" meeting with Chloe's best friend, Livia, at an art event, followed by another run-in at a yoga class. 

Sasha then infiltrates Chloe's group of close-knit friends. She also gains a job outside her genuine work experience through Livia's contacts as she attempts to discover why Chloe died. Through her new alter-ego, she leads a life that is far more exciting than her life as Becky.

A series of flashbacks reveals that Becky had two missed calls from Chloe minutes before her death. As Sasha, Becky eventually uncovers the truth of Chloe’s clandestine activities she has hidden from her husband and friends.

Becky starts an affair with Chloe's widowed husband, Elliot; whereas the rest of the group including Elliot's mother disapproves of their relationship. Elliot decides to run for election, Becky and Livia run his campaign along with Elliot's friend Nish. 

Becky carries on the investigation questioning all the group one by one to find out Chloe was trying to escape from controlling Elliot, who was forcing her to take medication and completely controlled her finances. However on the night of the planned escape, Richard, who was supposed to help her, does not appear. Chloe goes to her parents house and her mom informed Elliot about her whereabouts. Elliot comes to pick her up, Chloe runs from him and is dead, presumably killed by Elliot.

Livia exposes Becky and the group abandons her. She meets Elliot one last time to record his angry and vicious outburst and posts it on instagram from Chloe's account.

Livia and Becky meet one last time to reconcile and Becky gives Livia her new number and she leaves.

Cast
 Erin Doherty as Becky Green
 Billy Howle as Elliot Fairbourne
 Pippa Bennett-Warner as Livia Fulton
 Jack Farthing as Richard Greenbank
 Poppy Gilbert as Chloe Fairbourne
 Akshay Khanna as Anish
 Brandon Micheal Hall as Josh Stanfield
 Lisa Palfrey as Pam
 Scott Rose-Marsh as Jerome
 Alexander Eliot as Phil Fulton

Episodes

Production

Development
Series creator Seabright co-wrote the series with Kayleigh Llewellyn, Poppy Cogan, Bolu Babalola and Sam Baron. It is produced by Joanna Crow and executive produced by Tally Garner and Morven Reid at Mam Tor Productions, and Ben Irving at the BBC. The series was first announced by the BBC in February 2020. On April 20, 2021, Amazon Studios announced that it would co-produce the series.

Cast
The cast was announced in April 2021, with Erin Doherty, Billy Howle, Pippa Bennett-Warner, and Jack Farthing set to star. Seabright has said they had Doherty in mind for the lead role at a very early stage.

Filming
Principal photography took place on location in Burnham-on-Sea, Brean Down and Bristol at The Bottle Yard Studios. The work of local artists is featured in Chloe.

Music
The score is composed by Will Gregory of the music duo Goldfrapp, featuring his musical partner Alison Goldfrapp, and Adrian Utley of Bristol band Portishead.

Broadcast
The BBC released a trailer for the series in January 2022, announcing its 6 February 2022 BBC One and BBC iPlayer airdate. The series will be released on Amazon Prime internationally.

Reception
On the review aggregation website Rotten Tomatoes, the series holds a "Certified Fresh" approval rating of 94% with an average rating of 7.8 out of 10, based on 31 reviews. The website's critical consensus said, "Chloe can sometimes strain credulity, but Erin Doherty's excellent performance brings a human touch to this technological thriller." On Metacritic, which uses a weighted average, the series received a score of 86 out of 100, based on 13 critic reviews, indicating "universal acclaim".

Lucy Mangan of The Guardian wrote, "There is not one false note in this fierce, fresh murder mystery... It's an absolute feast of a show," adding, "It is a fierce, fresh sort-of-murder-mystery that is as keenly scripted as it is paced, and whose many threads are held firmly together by an outstanding performance from Erin Doherty." Sabrina Barr of Metro wrote that the series "highlights the unhealthy obsession that many of us can have both on social media and on comparing our lives to others."

Accolades
Chloe was nominated in the Limited-Series category at the Royal Television Society Programme Awards in March 2023.

References

External links

2022 British television series debuts
2022 British television series endings
2020s British drama television series
2020s British television miniseries 
BBC Television shows
British thriller television series
Amazon Prime Video original programming
English-language television shows
Television shows shot in Bristol
Television series about social media
Television series by Banijay
Television series by Amazon Studios